Bonnielin Swenor (née Sceurman) is an American epidemiologist who is an associate professor and director of the Johns Hopkins University Disability Health Research Center. She seeks to address inequities impacting people with disabilities and change public perception of disability, away from "living with disability" and toward "thriving with a disability".

Early life and education 
Swenor was an undergraduate at Pennsylvania State University, where she majored in microbiology and biochemistry. She moved to the Johns Hopkins University for graduate research and specialized in epidemiology. She completed her doctoral research under the supervision of Sheila West. Her doctorate considered visual impairment and mobility disability. As a student, she experienced rapid vision loss: multiple broken blood vessels in her retinas. She was a postdoctoral fellow at the National Institute on Aging, where she worked alongside Stephanie Studenski and Luigi Ferrucci.

Research and career 
Swenor started her independent academic career at Johns Hopkins University, where she founded the Disability Health Research Center. She is committed to ending health inequities for people with disabilities. She has said that her research is motivated by her own experiences of living with vision impairment. Swenor's research has examined the relationship between vision loss and brain function, and the impact of vision loss on mental health. She joined the Wilmer Ophthalmological Institute in 2014 and later joined the Johns Hopkins School of Nursing in 2022.

Swenor has argued that scientists with disabilities should have improved access to scientific funding. Although one in four Americans have a disability, only around 10% of employed scientists have one. In an interview Swenor said, "To reflect the realities of our society, we should have far more people with disabilities working in research and medicine,". She has argued that open access research can benefit people with disabilities, who struggle to access data and peer-reviewed publications in accessible formats. She believes that data must be accessible, and that partnerships with the disability community are key for public health strategies.

In 2021, Swenor was elected to The Ophthalmologist Power List.

Selected publications

References 

Year of birth missing (living people)
American women scientists
Pennsylvania State University alumni
American disability rights activists
Living people